Jean Brito or Jan Brulelou (active 1455–1483) was a Breton printer in the Burgundian Netherlands. He was born in Pipriac, a village approximately halfway between Rennes and Nantes. He moved to Tournai where he worked as a calligrapher. Then he moved to Bruges, where he became a printer in the course of the 1470s. In a short verse he refers to himself as a citizen of Bruges.

References 

People from Tournai
Businesspeople from Bruges
Breton artists
Medieval European scribes
15th-century printers
Year of birth missing
Year of death missing
Burgundian Netherlands businesspeople